The Witch of the North may refer to:

Locasta, the Good Witch of the North in the 1900 novel The Wonderful Wizard of Oz
Glinda the Good Witch of the North, a character in the 1939 film The Wizard of Oz
Mombi, the Wicked Witch of the North in the 1904 novel The Marvelous Land of Oz
Addaperle, the Good Witch of the North in the 1974 musical The Wiz
"The Witch of the North", 2021 album by Burning Witches